USS Franklin D. Roosevelt (CVB/CVA/CV-42) was the second of three s. To her crew, she was known as "Swanky Franky," "Foo-De-Roo," or "Rosie," with the last nickname probably the most popular. Roosevelt spent most of her active deployed career operating in the Mediterranean Sea as part of the United States Sixth Fleet. The ship was decommissioned in 1977 and was scrapped shortly afterward. She was the first aircraft carrier of the United States Navy to be named in honor of a president of the United States.

Early career 

Franklin D. Roosevelt was laid down at New York Naval Shipyard on 1 December 1943. Sponsor Mrs. John H. Towers, wife of the Deputy Commander-in-Chief, Pacific Fleet, christened the ship Coral Sea at the 29 April 1945 launching. On 8 May 1945, President Harry S. Truman approved the Secretary of the Navy's recommendation to rename the ship Franklin D. Roosevelt in honor of the late president, who had died four weeks earlier.

Roosevelt was commissioned on Navy Day, 27 October 1945, at the New York Naval Shipyard. Capt. Apollo Soucek was the ship's first commanding officer. During her shakedown cruise, Roosevelt called at Rio de Janeiro from 1 to 11 February 1946 to represent the United States at the inauguration of Brazilian president Eurico Gaspar Dutra, who came aboard for a short cruise. During April and May, Roosevelt participated in Eighth Fleet maneuvers off the East Coast, the Navy's first major postwar training exercise.

On 21 July 1946, Roosevelt became the first American carrier to operate an all-jet aircraft under controlled conditions. Lieutenant Commander James Davidson, flying the McDonnell XFD-1 Phantom, made a series of successful take-offs and landings as Roosevelt lay off Cape Henry, Virginia. Jet trials continued in November, when Lt. Col. Marion E. Carl, USMC, made two catapult launches, four unassisted take-offs, and five arrested landings in a Lockheed P-80A.

Fleet maneuvers and other training operations in the Caribbean preceded Roosevelts first deployment to the Mediterranean, which lasted from August to October 1946. Roosevelt, flying the flag of Rear Admiral John H. Cassady, Commander, Carrier Division 1, led the U.S. Navy force that arrived in Piraeus on 5 September 1946. This visit showed U.S. support for the pro-Western government of Greece, which was locked in a civil war with Communist insurgents. The ship received thousands of visitors during her calls to many Mediterranean ports. This was the first of twenty Mediterranean deployments Roosevelt would make, initiating an American aircraft carrier presence that would develop into the United States Sixth Fleet.

Roosevelt returned to American waters and operated off the East Coast until July 1947, when her open bow was destroyed by a storm, which forced her to go to Norfolk Naval Shipyard for an extensive overhaul. At that time, her quad 40 mm Bofors anti-aircraft guns were replaced by 40  Mark 22 guns in Mark 33 twin mountings.

From September 1948 to January 1949, Roosevelt undertook a second tour of duty with U.S. Naval Forces, Mediterranean. In 1950, Roosevelt became the first carrier to take nuclear weapons to sea. In September and October 1952, she participated in Operation Mainbrace, the first major NATO exercise in the North Atlantic.

Roosevelt was reclassified CVA-42 on 1 October 1952. On 7 January 1954, she sailed for Puget Sound Naval Shipyard to undergo extensive reconstruction. Too large to pass through the Panama Canal, Roosevelt rounded Cape Horn and arrived at the shipyard on 5 March 1954. She was temporarily decommissioned there for her refit on 23 April 1954.

 Refit 

Franklin D. Roosevelt was the first of her class to undergo the SCB 110 reconstruction, at a cost of $48 million. She received an enclosed "hurricane bow," one C-11-2 and two C-11-1 steam catapults, strengthened arresting gear, an enlarged bridge, a mirror landing system, and a  angled flight deck. SPS-8 height finding radar and SPS-12 air search radar were mounted on a new tubular mast. The aft elevator was relocated to the starboard deck edge, the forward elevator was enlarged, and all elevators were uprated to  capacity. Aviation fuel bunkerage was increased from 350,000 to 450,000 gallons (1,320,000 to 1,700,000 L). Standard displacement rose to 51,000 tons, while deep load displacement rose to 63,400 tons. As weight compensation, several of the  Mark 16 anti-aircraft guns were landed, leaving only 10, and the 3,200-ton armor belt was removed. Hull blisters were also added to cope with the increased weight. Franklin D. Roosevelt recommissioned on 6 April 1956.

After post-refit trials, Roosevelt sailed for her new homeport of Mayport, Florida. In February 1957, Franklin D. Roosevelt conducted cold weather tests of catapults, aircraft, and the Regulus guided missile, in the Gulf of Maine. In July, she sailed for the first of three consecutive Sixth Fleet deployments. Her assignments in the Mediterranean added NATO exercises to her normal schedule of major fleet operations, and found her entertaining a distinguished list of guests each year.

During a 1958 mid-year overhaul, the 22 remaining  guns were removed.

On 24 October 1958, Franklin D. Roosevelt supported  in the evacuation of 56 American citizens and three foreign nationals from Nicara, Cuba, as the Cuban Revolution came to a climax.

In late 1960, the Control Instrument Company installed the first production Fresnel Lens Optical Landing System (FLOLS) onboard Franklin D. Roosevelt. She recorded her 100,000th aircraft landing in March 1961. During a 1963 overhaul, six more  guns were removed.

While operating in the Eastern Mediterranean in the fall of 1964, Franklin D. Roosevelt lost a blade from one of her 20-ton propellers. She proceeded from Naples, Italy, to New York with the number one shaft locked. After replacing the propeller at Bayonne, New Jersey, Franklin D. Roosevelt returned to the Mediterranean to complete her cruise.

From August 1966 to January 1967, Franklin D. Roosevelt made her only deployment to Southeast Asia, spending a total of 95 days "on the line." Her embarked airwing, Carrier Air Wing One, consisted mainly of F-4 Phantom IIs and A-4 Skyhawks. Roosevelt received one battle star for her service during the Vietnam War.

In January 1968, Italian actress Virna Lisi was invited by Franklin D. Roosevelts crew to participate in the ship's 22nd birthday celebrations. Lisi helped prepare 5,000 T-bone steaks at a large cook-out staged on the flight deck.

 Austere modernization 

Roosevelt was initially slated to undergo an extensive reconstruction (SCB 101.68) similar to that received by Midway from 1966 to 1970. This plan was derailed by massive cost overruns in Midways reconstruction, which eventually totalled $202 million. Roosevelt was therefore limited to an austere $46 million refit (SCB 103.68), enabling her to operate the Grumman A-6 Intruder and LTV A-7 Corsair II.

In July 1968, Roosevelt entered Norfolk Naval Shipyard for her 11-month modernization program. The forward centerline elevator was relocated to the starboard deck edge forward of the island, the port waist catapult was removed, the crew spaces were refurbished, and two of the four remaining  anti-aircraft turrets were removed. Roosevelt also received a deck edge spray system using the new seawater compatible fire-fighting chemical, Light Water. She put to sea again on 26 May 1969.

From 1 August 1969, Roosevelt embarked Carrier Air Wing Six, which served as the ship's air wing for the next seven cruises. In January 1970, Roosevelt returned to the Mediterranean for another Sixth Fleet deployment.

Roosevelts twenty-first Sixth Fleet deployment was marked by indirect participation in the October 1973 Yom Kippur War, as she served as a transit "landing field" for aircraft being delivered to Israel. The Roosevelt battlegroup, Task Force 60.2, also stood by for possible evacuation contingencies.

From 1973 through 1975, VAW-121 operated aboard Roosevelt as one of the last Grumman E-1 Tracer squadrons in the fleet. Roosevelt  received a multipurpose designation, CV-42''', on 30 June 1975, but she did not operate any anti-submarine aircraft. In June 1976, Roosevelt embarked VMA-231 with 14 AV-8A Harrier attack aircraft.

The ship embarked Carrier Air Wing Nineteen for its final deployment, which lasted from October 1976 to April 1977. VMA-231 was on board for this deployment, which demonstrated that VTOL aircraft could be integrated into fixed wing air operations, although limited fuel capacity required careful scheduling of their launch and land cycles. The AV-8A concentrated hot exhaust impinging directly perpendicular to the fight deck was unusually destructive to painted non-skid surfaces, and blowing detached pieces of the non-skid coating about created a high risk of foreign object damage (FOD) to nearby jet engines. On 12 January 1977, Roosevelt collided with the Liberian grain freighter Oceanus while transiting the Strait of Messina. Both ships were able to proceed to port under their own power.

 Decommissioning and disposal 

By the late 1970s, Roosevelt was in poor material condition. Deprived of the upgrades that Midway and  had received, Roosevelt was the least modern and least capable of the class. Furthermore, Roosevelt used General Electric turbines, which gave persistent problems and reduced speed compared to the Westinghouse units used on the other ships. The Navy therefore chose to decommission Roosevelt when the second  carrier, entered service in 1977. Roosevelt completed her final cruise in April 1977. She was officially decommissioned on 30 September 1977. The decommissioning ceremony was held on 1 October 1977 and the ship was stricken from the Navy Directory on the same day. Efforts to preserve Roosevelt as a museum ship in New York City failed.Roosevelts generally poor condition weighed against retaining her in the reserve fleet. Moreover, her low hangar height of  limited the aircraft types that she could handle. It was reasoned that existing s could handle the same types of aircraft at lower cost. Some admirals also feared that if Roosevelt were retained, the Carter Administration would use her reactivation as a reason to cancel future Nimitz-class carriers.

On 1 April 1978, the Defense Reutilization and Marketing Service sold the ship to River Terminal Development Company for $2.1 million. After usable equipment was removed from Roosevelt at the Norfolk Naval Shipyard's Inactive Ships Facility, the carrier was towed to Kearny, New Jersey. She arrived on 3 May 1978 and was scrapped that year. One of USS Franklin D. Roosevelt's 5"/54cal Mk.16 gun is on display at White Sands Missile Range Missile Park.

Awards and decorations

While the Sea Service Deployment Ribbon is retroactive to 15 August 1974, the USS Franklin D. Roosevelt was scrapped before the award was ever established and would have had to still be in active service to have received the award.

Gallery

 See also 
 List of aircraft carriers
 List of aircraft carriers of the United States Navy

 References 

 Notes 

 Bibliography 
 Grassey, Thomas B. "Retrospective: The Midway Class." United States Naval Institute Proceedings'' Vol. 112 (May 1986).

External links 

USS Franklin D. Roosevelt historical website
USS Franklin D. Roosevelt reunion website
 
 

Midway-class aircraft carriers
Ships built in Brooklyn
1945 ships
World War II aircraft carriers of the United States
Cold War aircraft carriers of the United States
Vietnam War aircraft carriers of the United States
Monuments and memorials to Franklin D. Roosevelt in the United States